The 1995 Buffalo Bills season was the franchise's 26th season in the National Football League and the 36th overall. This was the last time the Bills won the division and won a playoff game until 2020.

After suffering a losing season the previous season, the 1995 Bills won the AFC East, and made the playoffs for the seventh time in eight seasons. They defeated the Miami Dolphins in the Wild Card Game in Don Shula's final game as an NFL head coach. The following week they lost to the eventual AFC Champions, the Pittsburgh Steelers. Until 2020, this season was the last time the Bills won the AFC East, and the playoff win over Miami represents the last time that the Bills have won a playoff game until 2020.

In his first season with the team, defensive end Bryce Paup was named NFL Defensive Player of the Year. Paup led the NFL with 17.5 sacks, the fourth-highest single-season total of the 1990s.

During the season, head coach Marv Levy underwent successful treatment for prostate cancer; assistant Elijah Pitts filled in as interim coach until Levy returned after a three-game absence.

Off-season

1995 Expansion Draft

NFL Draft

Personnel

Staff

Roster

Regular season

Schedule

Season summary

Week 1 at Broncos

The Bills first game in Denver since 1977

Week 5

Week 6 
Starting QBs -> New York Jets: Boomer Esiason / Buffalo Bills: Jim Kelly

Vegas Line:	Buffalo Bills -9.5 /// Over/Under:	38.0 (over)

Thurman Thomas becomes the 11th player all-time to go over the 9,000 career rushing yard mark in this game.

Boomer Esiason was knocked out in the second quarter by Bruce Smith , thus putting Bubby Brister into the game. On his first snap in the game, he fumbled the ball and turned it over to Buffalo.

Week 10 
Elijah Pitts was the Buffalo Bills head coach for this game as Marv Levy was recovering from illness.

Starting QBs: Buffalo Bills: Jim Kelly vs Indianapolis Colts: Jim Harbaugh.

In this game, Jim Harbaugh started, but midway through the first quarter Paul Justin was put in by coach Ted Marchibroda as Harbaugh was injured. This wasn't the end for the Colts QB situation, as Justin was hit by Bryce Paup knocking him out of the game. Harbaugh came in briefly after Justin was knocked out, however, Craig Erickson came into the game to finish it out.

Vegas Line:	Indianapolis Colts -4.0

Week 11

Week 12 
Starting QBs -> New York Jets: Boomer Esiason / Buffalo Bills: Jim Kelly

Vegas Line:	Buffalo Bills -6.5 /// Over/Under:	37.0 (over)

Boomer Esiason throws a last second hail mary TD pass to Adrian Murrell , however, failed on the 2-pt conversion to send the game into OT.

Week 15

Standings

Playoffs

AFC Wild Card Game 

In Buffalo's first playoff game since losing Super Bowl XXVIII two seasons earlier, the Bills handled Miami easily by a score of 37–22 at Rich Stadium. Although Dolphins quarterback Dan Marino completed 33 out of 64 passes for 422 yards and two touchdowns, the Bills jumped to a 27–0 lead going into the fourth quarter, and rushed for an NFL playoff-record 341 yards, led by Thurman Thomas's 25 carries for 158 yards. The Bills forced four turnovers, including intercepting Marino three times, in the victory. It was the final game of Don Shula's coaching career with the Dolphins.

AFC Divisional Playoff 

Running back Bam Morris scored two touchdowns in the fourth quarter as the Steelers stopped the Bills from pulling off a comeback. Pittsburgh jumped to a 20–0 lead by the second quarter with running back John L. Williams's 1-yard touchdown, quarterback Neil O'Donnell's 10-yard touchdown pass to wide receiver Ernie Mills, and two field goals by Norm Johnson. However, Buffalo running back Thurman Thomas scored a 1-yard touchdown run with 45 seconds left in the first half. But Johnson made a 34-yard field goal with eight seconds left to give the Steelers a 23–7 halftime lead. In the third quarter, Johnson added a 39-yard field goal before Bills tight end Tony Cline caught a 2-yard touchdown reception. With 11:23 left in the game, Thomas scored on a 9-yard touchdown reception to cut the lead to 26–21. In response, Pittsburgh drove 76 yards to score on Morris' 13-yard touchdown run. Linebacker Levon Kirkland then intercepted a pass to set up Morris' 2-yard score with 1:58 remaining to clinch the victory. Bruce Smith was inactive for the game because he had a 106-degree fever; Smith wanted to play but the Bills' medical staff said "no".

Awards and honors 
 Bryce Paup, NFL Defensive Player of the Year
 Bryce Paup, AFC Pro Bowl selection

References

External links 
 Bills on Pro Football Reference
 Bills on jt-sw.com
 Bills Stats on jt-sw.com

Buffalo Bills seasons
Buffalo Bills
AFC East championship seasons
Buff